Sydney Maree (born September 9, 1956) is a former middle distance runner who competed at the international level in the 1980s. He was the first South African to run officially under 3:30 in the 1500m. He was born in Cullinan, South Africa, but later became a U.S. citizen, running for the United States in various competitions.

Running career
Maree attended Villanova University, where he was eight-time NCAA All American, including once in cross country, thrice indoors, and four times outdoors; two-time NCAA champion in the 1500 meters (1980, 1981), distance medley relay (1980, 1981) and once in the 5000 meters (1979). He also won the inaugural Fifth Avenue Mile in 1981 with 3:47.52, which remains the course record.

Maree's greatest success came in August 1983 when he broke Steve Ovett's world record over 1500 m at a meet in Cologne,  clocking 3:31.24 min. Two years later, Maree set a new US record of 3:29.77 min; however, this was not a world record as a few weeks before Saïd Aouita had run 3:29.46. Maree was an excellent 5000-m runner, as well. In Oslo in 1985, he set a US record at 13:01.15 min. finishing just behind Aouita who set a world record.

Maree's personal bests include the aforementioned 3:29.77 for the 1500 meters (1985, the American Record for 20 years), 3:48.83 for the mile (1981), 4:54.20 in the 2000 meters (1985, then a US record), 7:33.37 for 3000 meters (1984, also then an American record), and the previously mentioned American record of 13:01.15 in the 5000 meters. He was USA's runner in the 5000 meters at the 1987 IAAF World Championships in Athletics (11th place) and the 1988 Olympic Games (where he finished in fifth place in the final).

Personal life
Maree is married with five children.  In 1995 he moved back to South Africa, later forming the asset management group Franklin Zamani, in Johannesburg, of which he became the CEO.

References

External links
 Profile

1956 births
Living people
People from the City of Tshwane Metropolitan Municipality
South African emigrants to the United States
South African male middle-distance runners
South African male long-distance runners
American male middle-distance runners
American male long-distance runners
Olympic track and field athletes of the United States
Athletes (track and field) at the 1984 Summer Olympics
Athletes (track and field) at the 1988 Summer Olympics
World Athletics Championships athletes for the United States
Villanova Wildcats men's track and field athletes
World record setters in athletics (track and field)
Recipients of the Order of Ikhamanga
Sportspeople from Gauteng